The Lower North Sea Group (abbreviation: NL) is a group of geologic formations in the subsurface of the Netherlands and adjacent parts of the North Sea. 

The group is part of the North Sea Supergroup and consists of two marine formations of early Paleogene age, the older Landen Formation and younger Dongen Formation. It is in most places stratigraphically on top of the Late Cretaceous Chalk Group and overlain by the late Paleogene Middle North Sea Group.

The Lower North Sea Group crops out in a few spots in the south of the Netherlands but is mostly overlain by younger deposits. It can be found in the subsurface of most of the Netherlands.

References

Geologic groups of Europe
Lithostratigraphy of the Netherlands
Geology of the North Sea
Paleogene Europe